Robert Bruce Ware is Professor of Philosophy at Southern Illinois University Edwardsville. Ware earned an AB in political science from UC Berkeley, an MA in philosophy from UC San Diego, and a D.Phil. from Oxford University. From 1996 to 2013, Ware conducted field research in North Caucasus and has published extensively on politics, ethnography, and religion of the region in scholarly journals and in the popular media. He has been cited as a leading specialist on Dagestan.
His recent research has focused upon the philosophy of mathematics and physics.

Selected publications

Books
 Hegel: The Logic of Self-consciousness and the Legacy of Subjective Freedom (Edinburgh University Press, 1999)
 Dagestan: Russian Hegemony and Islamic Resistance in the North Caucasus (with Enver Kisriev, M. E. Sharpe, 2010)
 The Fire Below: How the Caucasus Shaped Russia (edited, Bloomsbury, 2013)

Articles
 Chechenization: Ironies and Intricacies

References

External links
 Professional homepage

Living people
Year of birth missing (living people)
Alumni of the University of Oxford
Southern Illinois University Edwardsville faculty
Russian studies scholars
Politics of Dagestan
UC Berkeley College of Letters and Science alumni
University of California, San Diego alumni
Hegel scholars
20th-century American philosophers